Juan Pablo Rial (born 17 October 1984) is an Argentine professional footballer who last played for Marathón, as a striker.

Career
Rial made his debut for Charleroi in the 2010-11 season, having previously played in his native Argentina for Platense and All Boys.

References

1984 births
Living people
Argentine footballers
R. Charleroi S.C. players
Belgian Pro League players
Argentine expatriate footballers
Expatriate footballers in Belgium
Argentine expatriate sportspeople in Belgium
Association football forwards
Footballers from Buenos Aires